Santo Spirito or Spirito Santo (Italian forms of 'Holy Spirit') may refer to:

Abbeys
 Santo Spirito d'Ocre, Province of L'Aquila, Italy
 Abbey of the Holy Spirit at Monte Morrone, Sulmona (Abbazia di Santo Spirito al Morrone, Sulmona), Province of L'Aquila, Italy

Churches
 Santo Spirito, Bergamo, Lombardy, Italy
 Santo Spirito, Cingoli, Marche, Italy
 Santo Spirito, Florence, Italy
 Santo Spirito dei Napoletani, Rome, Italy
 Santo Spirito in Sassia, Rome, Italy
 Santo Spirito (Siena), Tuscany, Italy
 Santo Spirito, Urbania, Marche, Italy
 Santo Spirito, Venice, Venice, Italy
 Spirito Santo, Cortona, Tuscany, Italy
 Spirito Santo alla Ferratella, Rome, Italy

Other uses
 Banco di Santo Spirito, Italy
 Ospedale di Santo Spirito in Sassia, the oldest hospital in Europe (opened 727 AD), located in Rome

See also

Espiritu Santo (disambiguation)
Espírito Santo (disambiguation)
Sancti Spiritus (disambiguation)
Santo Espírito, Vila do Porto, Azores